Verkhny Baskunchak is an urban-type settlement in Akhtubinsky District of Astrakhan Oblast, Russia. Population:

Climate

References

Notes

Sources

Urban-type settlements in Astrakhan Oblast